Deese is a surname. Notable people with the surname include:

Brian Deese (born 1978), American political advisor
Derrick Deese (born 1970), American football player
Derrick Deese Jr. (born 1998), American football player
James Deese (1921–1999), American psychologist
James Henry Deese (1914–2001), American aerospace engineer
Rupert Deese (1924-2010), American ceramic artist